In probability theory and statistics, the noncentral chi-squared distribution (or noncentral chi-square distribution, noncentral  distribution) is a noncentral generalization of the chi-squared distribution.  It often arises in the power analysis of statistical tests in which the null distribution is (perhaps asymptotically) a chi-squared distribution; important examples of such tests are the likelihood-ratio tests.

Definitions

Background 
Let  be k independent, normally distributed random variables with means  and unit variances. Then the random variable

 

is distributed according to the noncentral chi-squared distribution.

 

 is sometimes called the noncentrality parameter. Note that some references define  in other ways, such as half of the above sum, or its square root.

This distribution arises in multivariate statistics as a derivative of the multivariate normal distribution. While the central chi-squared distribution is the squared norm of a random vector with  distribution (i.e., the squared distance from the origin to a point taken at random from that distribution), the non-central  is the squared norm of a random vector with  distribution.

Density 
The probability density function (pdf) is given by

where  is distributed as chi-squared with  degrees of freedom.

From this representation, the noncentral chi-squared distribution is seen to be a Poisson-weighted mixture of central chi-squared distributions. Suppose that a random variable J has a Poisson distribution with mean , and the conditional distribution of Z given J = i is chi-squared with k + 2i degrees of freedom. Then the unconditional distribution of Z is non-central chi-squared with k degrees of freedom, and non-centrality parameter .

Alternatively, the pdf can be written as
 

where  is a modified Bessel function of the first kind given by

Using the relation between Bessel functions and hypergeometric functions, the pdf can also be written as:

Siegel (1979) discusses the case k = 0 specifically (zero degrees of freedom), in which case the distribution has a discrete component at zero.

Derivation of the pdf 
The derivation of the probability density function is most easily done by performing the following steps:

 Since  have unit variances, their joint distribution is spherically symmetric, up to a location shift.
 The spherical symmetry then implies that the distribution of  depends on the means only through the squared length, .
Simple transformation of random variables shows that

where  is the standard normal density.
 Expand the cosh term in a Taylor series. This gives the Poisson-weighted mixture representation of the density, still for k = 1. The indices on the chi-squared random variables in the series above are 1 + 2i in this case.
 Finally, for the general case. The indices in the series are (1 + 2i) + (k − 1) = k + 2i as required.

Properties

Moment generating function 
The moment-generating function is given by

Moments 
The first few raw moments are:

The first few central moments are:

The nth cumulant is

Hence

Cumulative distribution function 
Again using the relation between the central and noncentral chi-squared distributions, the cumulative distribution function (cdf) can be written as

where  is the cumulative distribution function of the central chi-squared distribution with k degrees of freedom which is given by

and where  is the lower incomplete gamma function.

The Marcum Q-function  can also be used to represent the cdf.

When the degrees of freedom k is positive odd integer, we have a closed form expression for the complementary cumulative distribution function given by

where n is non-negative integer, Q is the Gaussian Q-function, and I is the modified Bessel function of first kind with half-integer order. The modified Bessel function of first kind with half-integer order in itself can be represented as a finite sum in terms of hyperbolic functions.

In particular, for k = 1, we have

Also, for k = 3, we have

Approximation (including for quantiles) 
Abdel-Aty derives (as "first approx.") a non-central Wilson–Hilferty transformation:

 is approximately normally distributed,  i.e.,

which is quite accurate and well adapting to the noncentrality.

Sankaran discusses a number of closed form approximations for the cumulative distribution function. In an earlier paper, he derived and states the following approximation:

where
 denotes the cumulative distribution function of the standard normal distribution;

This and other approximations are discussed in a later text book.

More recently, since the CDF of non-central chi-squared distribution with odd degree of freedom can be exactly computed, the CDF for even degree of freedom can be approximated by exploiting the monotonicity and log-concavity properties of Marcum-Q function as

Another approximation that also serves as an upper bound is given by

Related distributions 
If  is chi-square distributed  then  is also non-central chi-square distributed: 
A linear combination of independent noncentral chi-squared variables , is generalized chi-square distributed.
If , then 
If , then  takes the Rice distribution with parameter .
This can be seen using moment generating functions as follows:  by the independence of the  random variables. It remains to plug in the MGF for the non-central chi square distributions into the product and compute the new MGF – this is left as an exercise. Alternatively it can be seen via the interpretation in the background section above as sums of squares of independent normally distributed random variables with variances of 1 and the specified means.
 The complex noncentral chi-squared distribution has applications in radio communication and radar systems. Then the real random variable  is distributed according to the complex noncentral chi-squared distribution, which is effectively a scaled (by 1/2) non-central  with twice the degree of freedom and twice the noncentrality parameter:
 
where

Transformations 

Sankaran (1963) discusses the transformations of the form
. He analyzes the expansions of the cumulants of  up to the term  and shows that the following choices of  produce reasonable results:

  makes the second cumulant of  approximately independent of 
  makes the third cumulant of  approximately independent of 
  makes the fourth cumulant of  approximately independent of 

Also, a simpler transformation  can be used as a variance stabilizing transformation that produces a random variable with mean  and variance .

Usability of these transformations may be hampered by the need to take the square roots of negative numbers.

Occurrence and applications

Use in tolerance intervals 
Two-sided normal regression tolerance intervals can be obtained based on the noncentral chi-squared distribution. This enables the calculation of a statistical interval within which, with some confidence level, a specified proportion of a sampled population falls.

Notes

References 
 Abramowitz, M. and Stegun, I. A. (1972), Handbook of Mathematical Functions, Dover. Section 26.4.25.
 Johnson, N. L., Kotz, S., Balakrishnan, N. (1995), Continuous Univariate Distributions, Volume 2 (2nd Edition), Wiley. 
 Muirhead, R. (2005) Aspects of Multivariate Statistical Theory (2nd Edition). Wiley. 
 Siegel, A. F. (1979), "The noncentral chi-squared distribution with zero degrees of freedom and testing for uniformity", Biometrika, 66, 381–386
 

Continuous distributions
c